An Electric Storm is the debut album by electronic music group White Noise. The band recorded the first two tracks with the intention of producing a single only, but were then persuaded by Chris Blackwell of Island Records to create an entire album.  At this point the group had established the Kaleidophon Studio in a flat in Camden Town, London, and spent a year creating the next four tracks. The last track was put together in one day when Island demanded the completion of the album. Although not very successful on its initial release, the album is now considered an important and influential album in the development of electronic music.

A brief extract from the track "Black Mass: An Electric Storm in Hell" can be heard in the Hammer Film Productions film Dracula AD 1972.

Track listing
Phase-In

Phase-Out

Personnel
The following people contributed to An Electric Storm:
 Kaleidophon – production
 David Vorhaus – production co-ordinator
 Delia Derbyshire, Brian Hodgson – electronic sound realisation
 Paul Lytton  – percussion
 John Whitman, Annie Bird, Val Shaw – vocals

Releases
 June 1969 - LP, Island Records, catalog number ILPS 9099
 27 March 1995 - CD, "3D Island" label, Island Records, 3DCID 1001; deleted 1996
 9 July 2007 - CD re-released, Island Remasters

References

External links
 Head Heritage  Review by Julian Cope

1969 debut albums
White Noise (band) albums
Island Records albums
Albums produced by David Vorhaus
Avant-pop albums
Electronic albums by English artists
Psychedelic pop albums
Experimental pop albums